= Avenida Monseñor Rivero =

Coordinates: 17°46′23.07″S 63°10′56.5″W

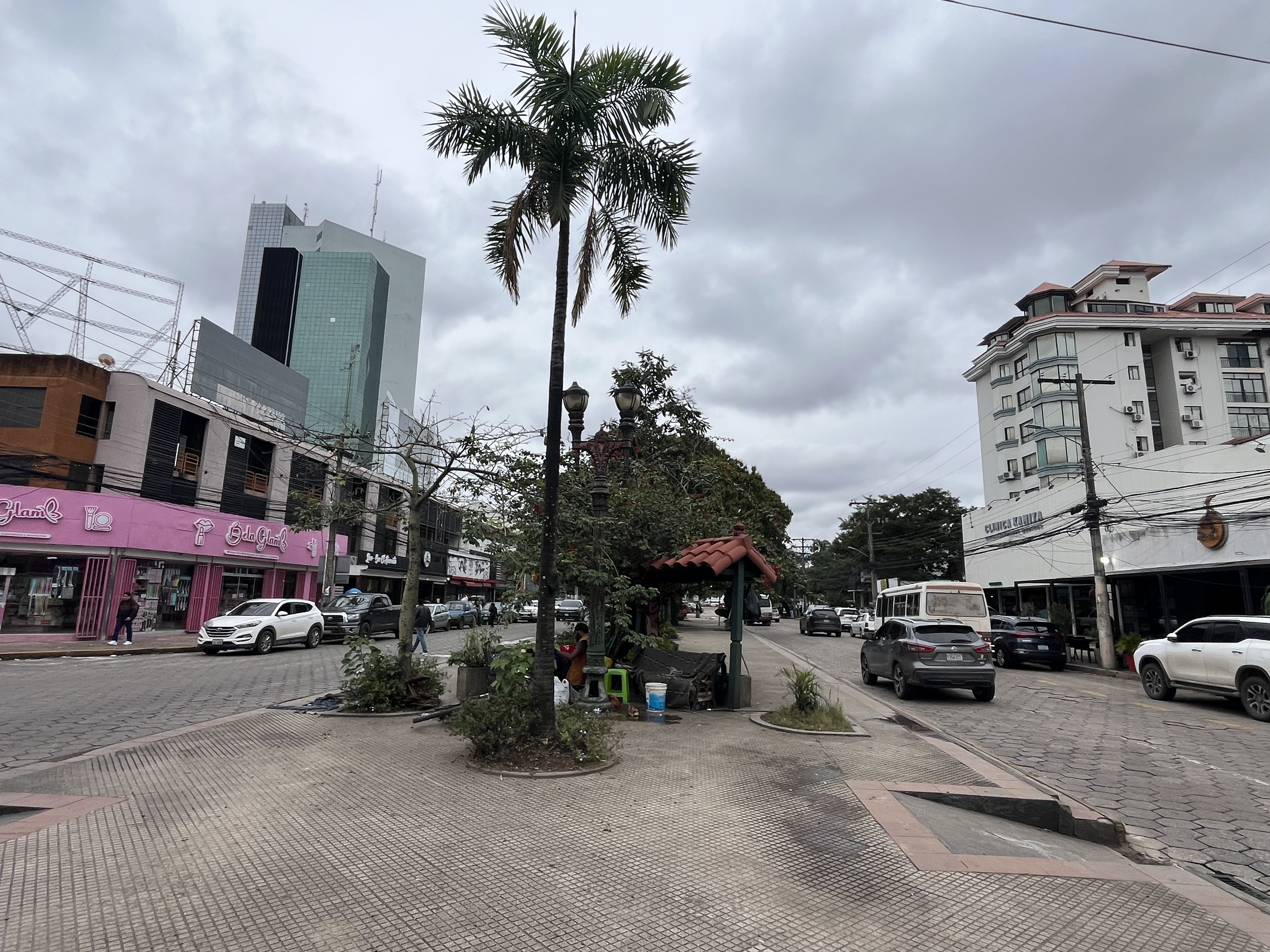
Avenida Monseñor Rivero

Avenida Monseñor Rivero is a street in Santa Cruz de la Sierra, Bolivia. It is located between the 1st and 2nd ring roads of the city, and is full of restaurants, cafes and bars catering to the wealthier sectors.

At one end of the street stands the Cristo Redentor statue, which is used as an iconic image of cruceño identity. The statue by Emiliano Luján was inaugurated in 1960. It was financed by donations from cruceña women in La Paz. At the other end lies the Palacio de Justicia ('Palace of Justice'), constructed in 1996.

The annual Santa Cruz carnival procession passes through the left-hand side of Avenida Monseñor Rivero, before reaching the Cristo Redentor statue. The procession then returns towards the centre through the right-hand side of Avendia Monseñor Rivero.

In 2003 an illuminated glass fountain was installed at the avenue. The fountain was supposed to symbolize the cultural diversity of the city. The fountain was however removed in 2008 (having been out of function for a longer period of time), when the street underwent renovation.
